Drab is an adjective for boring. "Drab" may also refer to:

Drab (color), a dull light brown color
Olive drab, a shade of green